Daniel Garza (born 8 April 1985) is a Mexican professional tennis player.

He participated in the Davis Cup representing Mexico eight times. His most important victory was during the 2008 Davis Cup tie against Uruguay which he won in four sets to Uruguayan Pablo Cuevas on carpet. He has a Davis Cup singles record of  16-8 as well as a doubles record of 6-2 for a combined total of 22-10. 

Garza made his ATP tour main draw debut (other than in Davis cup play) at the 2011 Mexican Open where he was granted a wild cart entry. He would go on to lose in the first round to compatriot Santiago Gonzalez 2-6, 6–7(5-7). The following year at the 2012 Mexican Open he would repeat his wild card entry, as well as his first round exit, this time at the hands of Lukasz Kubot 1-6, 3–6. For the third consecutive year, he entered the 2013 Mexican Open via wild card, and lost in the first round to Martin Alund 6–7(7-9), 5–7. His final appearance at the tournament (and in non-Davis cup play) was at the 2015 Mexican Open given another wild card, and losing in the first round to Viktor Troicki 4-6, 3–6.

Match-fixing scandal
In October 2016, Garza was banned for six months and fined $5000 for attempting to match-fix at an ITF tournament in Casabalas, USA.

ATP Challenger and ITF Futures finals

Singles: 17 (8–9)

Doubles: 58 (27–31)

Notes

References

External links

1985 births
Mexican male tennis players
Sportspeople from Monterrey
Living people
Tennis players at the 2011 Pan American Games
Pan American Games competitors for Mexico
Central American and Caribbean Games gold medalists for Mexico
Central American and Caribbean Games silver medalists for Mexico
Central American and Caribbean Games bronze medalists for Mexico
Competitors at the 2006 Central American and Caribbean Games
Competitors at the 2010 Central American and Caribbean Games
Central American and Caribbean Games medalists in tennis
Tennis players at the 2007 Pan American Games
21st-century Mexican people